Inkosi Sango Patekile Holomisa (born 26 August 1959) is an ANC politician and the Deputy Minister of Correctional Services in South Africa, having been the Deputy Minister of Labour before.

See also

Constitution of South Africa
History of the African National Congress
Politics in South Africa

References

1959 births
Living people
African National Congress politicians
Correctional Services ministers of South Africa
21st-century South African politicians
Members of the National Assembly of South Africa